Toby Wren is an Australian jazz composer and performer. He performs in the Toby Wren Trio/Quartet, the Carnatic Jazz Experiment, which incorporates Indian music, and he led the sextet Finders Keepers.

Education
Wren graduated from the Queensland Conservatorium in 1998.

Career
He was selected for the Australian Composers Orchestral Forum twice, and has been a Composer Affiliate of The Queensland Orchestra. In 1997, he won the DIGF composition prize for his guitar piece "Nebbish". He was a finalist in the APRA Music Awards in 2011, in a jazz category. In 2006 and 2008, Wren travelled to India to learn about Carnatic music. He has written arrangements for George, Rhubarb and Chris Pickering. He has also collaborated with other artists, including saxophonist Rafael Karlen.

Discography 
 Fat Lip 81 (with Babel) - 2001 
 Umlaut - 2006 
 Everything Must Go - 2008 
 Black Mountain - 2017

References

Australian jazz composers
Male jazz composers
Australian jazz guitarists
Jazz fusion guitarists
Living people
Year of birth missing (living people)
Australian male guitarists